The Coquitlam City Council is the governing body for the City of Coquitlam, British Columbia, Canada.

The council consists of the mayor and eight councillors.

The councillors are councilors-at-large elected for the entire city.

Municipal elections were held every three years across the Province on the third Saturday of November. However, the BC Government changed the Municipal Elections Act and moved  the date to the third Saturday of October. Thus, the election will be on Saturday, October 20, 2018.

Coquitlam City Council members 
2022–present
Elected in the 2022 municipal elections
Richard Stewart, Mayor
Craig Hodge, Councillor
Teri Towner, Councillor
Brent Asmundson, Councillor
Dennis Marsden, Councillor
Trish Mandewo, Councillor
Steve Kim, Councillor
Matt Djonlic, Councillor 
Robert Mazzarolo, Councillor

2018-2022 
Richard Stewart, Mayor
Craig Hodge, Councillor
Chris Wilson, Councillor
Teri Towner, Councillor
Bonita Zarrillo, Councillor (until 2021)
Brent Asmundson, Councillor
Dennis Marsden, Councillor
Trish Mandewo, Councillor
Steve Kim, Councillor

2014-2018 
Richard Stewart, Mayor
Brent Asmundson, Councillor
Craig Hodge, Councillor
Dennis Marsden, Councillor
Terry O'Neill, Councillor
Mae Reid, Councillor
Teri Towner, Councillor
Chris Wilson, Councillor
Bonita Zarrillo, Councillor

2011-2014
 Richard Stewart, Mayor
Brent Asmundson, Councillor
Craig Hodge, Councillor
Neal Nicholson, Councillor
Terry O'Neill, Councillor
Mae Reid, Councillor
Lou Sekora, Councillor

In the 2013 provincial election, two sitting councillors, Linda Reimer and Selina Robinson, were elected to the Legislative Assembly of British Columbia. Reimer initially speculated in the press about continuing to perform both roles, or simply taking an unpaid leave of absence from her city council duties until the 2014 municipal election, to spare taxpayers the expense of a by-election; the council ultimately decided on July 8, 2013 to hold by-elections to replace them.

References

External links 
Coquitlam City Council

Municipal councils in British Columbia
Politics of Coquitlam